CKTM-DT, virtual channel 13 (UHF digital channel 28), branded on-air as ICI Mauricie–Centre-du-Québec, is an Ici Radio-Canada Télé owned-and-operated station licensed to Trois-Rivières, Quebec, Canada and serving the Mauricie region. The station is owned by the Canadian Broadcasting Corporation (known in French as Société Radio-Canada). CKTM-DT's studios are located on Boulevard Saint-Jean (near Route 40) in Trois-Rivières, and its transmitter is located on Rue Principale in Notre-Dame-du-Mont-Carmel. On cable, the station is available on Cogeco Cable channel 3 and in high definition on digital channel 504.

History
The station first signed on April 15, 1958; the station was the very first broadcasting property owned by Cogeco, which was founded in Trois-Rivières the previous year.

Until June 2008, the station was owned by Cogeco and was a twinstick with the TQS O&O CFKM-TV. As a privately owned station, CKTM effectively functioned as a semi-satellite of CBFT in Montreal due to a lack of non-network sources of programming. The station had been owned directly by Cogeco prior to the latter's majority acquisition of TQS, to which Cogeco contributed its existing local stations. Radio-Canada took editorial control of the station's news programming in 2002, although it continued to share a studio with CFKM.

In September 2007, Radio-Canada announced that it would not renew its affiliation agreement with its three Cogeco-owned affiliates — CKTM, CKTV-TV in Saguenay and CKSH-TV in Sherbrooke — after their then-current agreement expired in August 2008. An application to directly acquire the stations was filed by Radio-Canada on April 25, 2008, concurrently with Cogeco's proposed sale of TQS to Remstar Corporation. The transaction was approved by the CRTC on June 26, 2008.

Radio-Canada relocated all its radio and television facilities in the region into an integrated production centre, which opened on March 22, 2010, in Trois-Rivières. Radio-Canada intends on increasing its local programming output on its radio and television stations in the region.

References

External links
  
 
 

KTM-DT
KTM-DT
Television channels and stations established in 1958
1958 establishments in Quebec